Parvathipuram revenue division (or Parvathipuram division) is an administrative division in the Parvathipuram Manyam district of the Indian state of Andhra Pradesh. It is one of the two revenue divisions in the district with eight mandals under its administration. The divisional headquarters are located at Parvathipuram.

Administration 
The 8 mandals administered under the revenue division are:

See also 
List of revenue divisions in Andhra Pradesh
List of mandals in Andhra Pradesh

References 

Revenue divisions in Vizianagaram district